The 2016 Solihull Metropolitan Borough Council election took place on 5 May 2016 to elect members of Solihull Metropolitan Borough Council in England. This was on the same day as other local elections.

The governing Conservative Party won 9 of the 17 seats up for election, gaining one from an Independent and losing one to the Green Party. In addition to this seat, the Greens gained another from the SDP, that of a former Green Councillor who had defected in August 2015. They also held their two existing seats to solidify their position as the Official Opposition in Solihull. The Liberal Democrats held their three seats and Labour held their one, the only seat they hold in Solihull.

Result

Council Composition

Prior to the election, the composition of the council was:

After the election, the composition of the council was:

Lib Dem - Liberal Democrats
Lab - Labour
Ind - Independent

Result by Ward

Bickenhill

Blythe

Castle Bromwich

Chelmsley Wood

z

Dorridge and Hockley Heath

Elmdon

Kingshurst and Fordbridge

Knowle

Lyndon

Meriden

Olton

Shirley East

Shirley South

Shirley West

Silhill

Smith's Wood

St. Alphege

By-elections between 2016 and 2018

References

2016 English local elections
2016
2010s in the West Midlands (county)